Palpibidion minimum is a species of beetle in the family Cerambycidae, the only species in the genus Palpibidion.

References

Ibidionini
Monotypic beetle genera